Showkat Hasanur Rahman Rimon is a Bangladesh Awami League politician and the incumbent Member of Parliament from Barguna-2.

Early life
Rimon born on 25 November 1964. He has a bachelor's and a master's degree in science.

Career
Rimon was elected to Parliament in October 2017 in a by-election following the death of the incumbent Golam Sabur Tulu in a road accident. Rimon received 65,813 votes while his nearest rival Golam Sarwar Hiru of Islami Andolon Bangladesh received 57,993 votes. Hiru alleged irregularities in the voting which was denied by Rimon.

Rimon elected to parliament in 2014 from Barguna-2 as a Bangladesh Awami League candidate. In March 2016, he was sued by the Bangladesh Election Commission for allegedly violating the electoral code of conduct. In August 2018 he was sued by the Md Idris Chowdhury, president of the Barguna district Tanti League for extortion. He faced some criticism from local Awami League activists for occupying the land of a religious shrine. He also faced flank for allegedly "insulting" a woman at a local arbitration in Barguna.

Rimon was re-elected in 2018 from Barguna-2 in as a candidate of Awami League.

References

Awami League politicians
Living people
1964 births
10th Jatiya Sangsad members
11th Jatiya Sangsad members
9th Jatiya Sangsad members